Giorgiana "Dana" Carteleanu  (born December 18, 1979) is a Romanian rhythmic gymnast.

Stoica competed for Romania in the rhythmic gymnastics individual all-around competition at the 1996 Summer Olympics in Atlanta. There she was 32nd in the qualification and didn't advance to the semifinal.

References

External links 
 
 

1979 births
Living people
Romanian rhythmic gymnasts
Gymnasts at the 1996 Summer Olympics
Olympic gymnasts of Romania